The Archery World Cup is a competition, started in 2006, organized by the World Archery Federation, where the archers compete in four stages in four countries and the best eight archers of each category (from 2010, four archers during 2006-09) advance to an additional stage to contest the Archery World Cup Final. This form of competition was introduced following the success of the 2003 World Archery Championships in New York and the 2004 Summer Olympics with the intent of making the sport more popular and attractive to spectators, with the matches being held in 'spectacular' locations and the final matches being broadcast online. It has received plaudits for its innovative approach to the sport, raising its profile and reach.

From 2013, the World Cup is broadcast live on Eurosport. It carries sponsorship from Kia and Longines, which supports the annual Longines Prize of Precision for archery, for the "best male and female athletes that master bow and arrow through concentration, balance, accuracy, and skill".

Prize money
The prize money for 2022 season was:

In the World Cup Finals the prize money for the individual competitions in 2018 was:
 1st place: 20,000 CHF
 2nd place: 10,000 CHF
 3rd place: 5,000 CHF
 4th place: 1,000 CHF

For each individual World Cup stage, the prize money offered for individual competitions in 2013 was:
 1st place: 2,000 CHF
 2nd place: 1,000 CHF
 3rd place: 500 CHF

Host venues

The following venues have hosted stages of the World Cup Final.

Past winners

Recurve

Men

Women

Mixed team

Compound

Men

Women

Mixed team

Longines Prize for Precision
The Longines Prize for Precision is awarded to the male and female archers who shoot the most 10s over the course of the competition at the end of the season. It has been awarded since 2010 and is awarded to compound and recurve archers in alternate years. Winners receive a trophy, watch and cash prize of 5,000 CHF.

Winners

All-time medal tables

Nations
Including all individual and team stage and final medals up to end of 2021 World Cup.

  Final host nation
  Stage host nation

Archers
The following table shows the total number of medals won in the individual competitions by all archers who have won at least two individual gold medals (including stage and finals).

Including all individual stage and final medals up to end of 2021 World Cup.

 Recurve archer 
 Compound archer

Indoor World Cup (Indoor Archery World Series)

An Indoor Archery World Cup was inaugurated in 2010. It is played in the off-season (November to February), with fewer stages and the final competed in Las Vegas. In 2014, the stages were held in Marrakesh, Singapore and Telford. 2019-2020 Indoor Archery World Series have 6 qualification and one final stage. After 2018, the World Indoor Archery Championships were discontinued, leaving the Indoor Archery World Series as the premier championship in indoor archery

References

External links
 World Archery Federation

 
Archery competitions
World cups